Tiger Creek is a stream in Catoosa County and Whitfield County, Georgia, in the United States.

Tiger Creek was named for a Cherokee Indian.

See also
List of rivers of Georgia (U.S. state)

References

Rivers of Catoosa County, Georgia
Rivers of Whitfield County, Georgia
Rivers of Georgia (U.S. state)